Yazpınar is a village in the Kozluk District, Batman Province, Turkey. Its population is 183 (2021).

The hamlet of Dolutaş is attached to the village.

References

Villages in Kozluk District

Kurdish settlements in Batman Province